Dominique Louis Féréol Papety (12 August 1815 – 19 September 1849) was a French painter. He is best known for his canvases and drawings on Greek themes, both Classical and contemporary, and is considered an early member of the Neo-Grec movement.

Biography 

He was born in Marseille. His father was a soap maker. After displaying some talent for drawing, Papety took lessons from  Augustin Aubert. In 1835, he enrolled at the École des Beaux-arts in Paris, where he studied with Léon Cogniet. The following year, he and  shared first place for the Prix de Rome. Papety's entry depicted Moses striking water from a stone with his staff.

He spent the years from 1837 to 1842 at the Villa Medicis. One of his teachers, Ingres, said that "...he was already a master when he touched a brush". His first exhibition at the Salon was in 1843.

Papety became a close friend of François Sabatier-Ungher, an art critic who was interested in antiquities. Together, they took a trip to Greece in 1846. He visited all twenty-three monasteries on Mount Athos, made hundreds of drawings and, the following year, published a combination travelogue and report in the Revue des deux Mondes titled Les peintures byzantines et les couvents de l'Athos; influenced by the ideas of  Charles Fourier. Those ideas also inspired his best known painting: Le Rêve du Bonheur (Dream of Happiness).

He took another trip to Greece, in 1847, and made sketches that were later used to decorate the Panthéon in Paris. In addition, he documented archaeological sites and made ethnographic studies of the local customs and costumes. Following a suggestion by the Duc de Montpensier, he created a scene commemorating the Royal Family's visit to Athens in 1845. When he returned to Marseille, he was ill with cholera. He appeared to improve, but occasional bouts of fever recurred and worsened during a stay in Camargue. 

The disease ultimately proved to be fatal and he died in Marseille in 1849, aged only thirty-four. This was after the Second Cholera Pandemic had reached France, so his funeral was unattended. His remaining works were sold at an auction.

A large selection of Papety's works was shown in a major exhibition at the French School at Athens in 1946, celebrating the school's centennial. A Street in Marseille has been named after him.

Gallery

References

Further reading 
 François Tamisier, Dominique Papety, Sa Vie Et Ses Oeuvres, Etude Biographique Et Litteraire, Hachette, 2013

External links

 Drawings and sketches by Papety @ the Base Joconde
 ArtNet: More works by Papety.
 "Les Peintures byzantines et les couvents de l’Athos" by Papety @ French Wikisource.

1815 births
1849 deaths
Artists from Marseille
19th-century French painters
French male painters
Prix de Rome for painting
Deaths from cholera
Burials in Provence-Alpes-Côte d'Azur
19th-century French male artists